The Beat Goes On, or variants, may refer to:

Music

Albums 
 The Beat Goes On (Herbie Mann album), 1967
 The Beat Goes On! (Sonny Criss album), 1968
 The Beat Goes On (Vanilla Fudge album), 1968
 The Beat Goes On: The Best of Sonny & Cher, 1991
 The Beat Goes On (Emilie-Claire Barlow album), 2010
 The Beat Goes On (Cash Cash album), 2012
 ... and the Beat Goes On!, 1995 album by Scooter
 The Beat Goes On, a 2009 album by Swedish singer Eva Eastwood
 The Beat Goes On (Super Junior D&E EP), 2015

Songs 
"Beat Goes On" (Madonna song), 2008
"The Beat Goes On" (Sonny & Cher song), 1967
"The Beat Goes On" (Beady Eye song), 2011
"And the Beat Goes On" (The Whispers song), 1979
"This Beat Goes On/Switchin' to Glide", a 1980 song by The Kings
"The Beat Goes On", a 2002 song by Bob Sinclar

Other uses 
 The Beat Goes On (short story collection), a book of Inspector Rebus short stories by Ian Rankin
 Beat Goes On Records (now BGO Records), a UK record company specialising in re-issues of music from the 1950s to the 1980s
 And the Beat Goes On (film), a 2009 film
 And the Beat Goes On, an autobiography of Sonny Bono
 And the Beat Goes On: The Sonny and Cher Story, a documentary on Sonny & Cher